In broadcasting, cancellation refers to when a radio or television program is abruptly ended by orders of the network or syndicator that distributes the show.

Programs are typically canceled for financial reasons; low viewership or listenership will lead to lower advertising or subscription revenue, prompting networks to replace it with another show with the potential to turn a larger profit. Likewise, a disproportionately high budget is potentially undesirable (this is somewhat complicated, as prominent programs have effects on the viewership of programs that air before and after; an expensive program may be worth the cost—a loss leader—if it increases the ratings of other shows on the network, while a profitable low-budget show may still be canceled if it lowers the ratings of the surrounding programs). Other potential reasons for canceling television programs include unfavorable critical reviews, controversies involving the program's cast, conflicts among the show's staff members or to make room for new programming.

Shows whose runs end due to a mutual creative decision by its creators, producers, cast, and the network it airs on (such as Seinfeld, The Sopranos, or The Cosby Show) are not considered to be "canceled" but rather "concluded" or "ended", with a special last episode called its series finale. Even so, programs that end their runs in this manner are sometimes incorrectly stated to have been canceled, even if the program was renewed for a final season (such as with American Idol, by which the term was incorrectly applied upon the announcement of Fox, Fremantle Media and 19 Entertainment's decision to renew the show for a 15th and final season in May 2015 to air in 2016); shows that are canceled traditionally end their runs during the television season in which the program airs first-run episodes at the time, either effective immediately after the announcement is made by the network or until all remaining episodes are broadcast.

The Friday night death slot is a perceived graveyard slot in American television, referring to the idea that a television program in the United States scheduled on Friday evenings is highly likely to be canceled.

Overview 
Commercial television and radio is supported by advertising. Subscription outlets, including cable and satellite television and satellite radio, have the additional revenue stream of subscriber fees (broadcast stations in some areas may also have retransmission consent privileges, but this is not universal; Canada, for instance, does not allow it). Viewing figures are collected by audience measurement ratings agencies (such as Nielsen in the United States), and the programs with the highest viewing figures command a higher advertising fee for the network. As such, shows with a low viewership are generally not as profitable. For most United States networks, the number of viewers within the 18–49 age range is more important than the total number of viewers. According to Advertising Age, during the 2007–08 season, Grey's Anatomy was able to charge $419,000 per television commercial, compared to only $248,000 for a commercial during CSI, despite CSI having almost five million more viewers on average. Due to its strength in young demographics, Friends was able to charge almost three times as much for a commercial as Murder, She Wrote, even though the two television series had similar total viewer numbers during the seasons they were on the air together. (A slight exception to this is CBS, whose self-stated target audience is persons 25 to 54 years old; because of this, CBS programs tend to favor slightly older audiences than their broadcast rivals.)

Other factors are considered as well, such as the cost to produce the show. For example, most game shows cost less money to produce than a drama series, so even if the game show has lesser ratings it may survive cancellation because of the higher profit margin. Game shows and self-contained reality shows, which can be produced on short order with very little preparation compared to scripted series and annual contests, may not be canceled in the same way, but merely have the network cease ordering episodes and end up in limbo (except for those that have high production costs); in turn, these types of shows are also easily brought back if a network needs to produce filler programming quickly (as was the case with Are You Smarter than a 5th Grader?, which was renewed more than three years after it had produced its last episode because of a programming shortage on Fox). Whether the show is produced by the network or an outside company can also factor into a show's future; networks, especially in the 21st century, tend to prefer shows that are produced in-house, as they can take advantage of vertical integration and, in addition to making money from the first run of the show on the network, continue to profit from syndicating the reruns. Thus, if two shows have similar ratings and expenses but one is produced by the network while the other is held by an outside company, the outsider program is more likely to be canceled. This was not an issue in the late 20th century, when Financial Interest and Syndication Rules prohibited American networks from owning syndicators.

Very rarely are television programs cancelled for reasons other than ratings or profitability. Notable cases are Turn-On and Australia's Naughtiest Home Videos, which were canceled after viewer and station outrage (in the latter case, it managed to be cancelled despite being a special, being pulled off-air midway through its lone airing by the network's owner); Bridget Loves Bernie, which was forced off the air in 1973 despite high ratings because of threats of violence from Jewish radicals; Flatbush, an adaptation of the film The Lords of Flatbush that was cancelled after three episodes due to its offensive ethnic portrayals and the resulting objections from Howard Golden, the Kings County executive; Home Run Derby, which was canceled in 1960 due to the host's death (Major League Baseball would make the concept an official annual event beginning in 1986); Roseanne, which was cancelled in 2018 despite considerable commercial success over objections to title star Roseanne Barr's social media comments (Roseanne was eventually retooled without Barr as The Conners); Megan Wants a Millionaire, which was cancelled in August 2009 following the arrest warrant and subsequent suicide of one of the finalists; Winky Dink and You, canceled because its interactive television component caused countless children to both sit too close to the TV set (raising concerns about X-ray radiation from early cathode ray tubes) and damage home television sets by drawing directly on the screens (the show was meant to be used with a plastic sheet covering the screen); and Cops and Live PD, which were both cancelled in June 2020 in the wake of protests following the murder of George Floyd (Cops would be revived a year later as an online-only production after the protests had subsided and the police officer who killed Floyd was convicted). One example of a television program that was canceled because of war is the CBS Television Quiz, which was cancelled by CBS in May 1942 in order to allow the United States government to divert resources to World War II. Several television programs were also canceled as a result of the COVID-19 pandemic; radio, which can more easily be produced remotely, was less affected, though some live programs (particularly Live from Here) did not survive.

A television series that attempts to tell a long, overarching story can be canceled even before it resolves all story arcs and broadcasts all of its planned episodes.  For some series that may be canceled, the creators may try to end the current season finale on a cliffhanger to give fans the impression that the series trul is unfinished and needs to keep telling more stories, but even that may not work and can produce a strong bout of disappointment if the series is cancelled anyway. An example of this is UPN sitcom Moesha

Some series that are renewed and planned for another season can also be cancelled, such as The Electric Company and Transformers: Animated.

Saved from cancellation

Occasionally, a show may be revived, or brought back into production after being previously cancelled. Such was the case with Unforgettable, a CBS crime drama that was canceled in 2012, but was revived in the summer of 2013. Sometimes, one network may decide to air a series previously cancelled by another network. For example, Family Matters and Step by Step both moved from ABC to CBS in their final season of production. This is an uncommon occurrence, and few programs have successfully made audience gains when changing networks.

In other cases, overwhelming fan response may lead to a show's revival. The original series of Star Trek was given an additional season after a letter-writing campaign from fans. Another successful letter-writing campaign helped revive Cagney & Lacey. In 2007, Jericho was given an additional seven-episode order after fans mailed thousands of pounds of nuts to network executives (a reference to a pivotal line in the season finale).

Strong home video sales and viewership on cable have also helped revive a series. Firefly and Police Squad! were revived in the form of theatrical films (an uncommon occurrence, since failed television series are usually not considered bankable movie material), Family Guy was returned to Fox, and Futurama (the volume 5 DVD cover touts the tag line "back by popular harassment!") returned in the form of straight to video films and a subsequent series of new television episodes for Comedy Central (although Comedy Central would later cancel the show itself). Arrested Development was revived for a fourth season in 2013 (seven years after being canceled by Fox) as a Netflix Original Series, after episodes of its initial run proved popular on the streaming service.

In some situations, a television series may be revived years after being cancelled. Often this is in the form of a spin-off show featuring new characters (such as Star Trek: The Next Generation which premiered eighteen years after the original series went off the air). Doctor Who, which was cancelled by the BBC in 1989, was brought back in 2005 as a continuation of the original run of shows. Both franchises also produced spin-off films in the periods they were cancelled. This approach has seen increased exposure in the 2010s, with shows such as Girl Meets World (a follow-up to Boy Meets World), Fuller House (a follow-up to Full House), Will & Grace and Roseanne  all returning to television approximately a full generation after the original series aired.

In 2018, Fox announced that it was cancelling the police procedural sitcom Brooklyn Nine-Nine, and police procedural urban fantasy Lucifer. Brooklyn Nine-Nine was subsequently picked up by NBC the following day. Lucifer was picked up by Netflix the following month.
 
A show can instead be retooled if the network thinks that changes can be made to a struggling program that will make the show more profitable and/or higher-rated. In a retooling, characters may be replaced or recast, plots may be abandoned, and in extreme cases, continuity can be erased and the name of the show changed, depending on how extensive of a retool is undertaken. (In more extreme cases, a retooling can resemble a full reboot of the storyline.) One example of such a scenario was Lovers and Friends, which was placed on hiatus in May 1977 and was retitled as For Richer, For Poorer when it returned in December 1977; the program would end in September 1978.

Cancellation in pop culture 
 The Adult Swim TV series Robot Chicken ends each season with a running gag in which the head of the network cancels the show, although the show has never actually been considered for cancellation."Robot Chicken": In Memoriam  - Adult Swim Video (accessed September 12, 2010)
 On Arthur, the episode "The Last of Mary Moo Cow" deals with the cancellation of D.W.'s favorite show, Mary Moo Cow. The fictional show is later revived in both episodes.
 On Garfield and Friends, the episodes "Binky Gets Cancelled" and "Binky Gets Cancelled Again!" deal with the cancellation of Garfield's favorite show The Binky Show. The fictional show is later revived.
 On The Adventures of Rocky and Bullwinkle, the entire show is cancelled in 1964, and Rocky and Bullwinkle feels sad and melancholy. Boris, Natasha and Fearless convinces Minnie Mogul into producing "The Rocky & Bullwinkle" movie and 6 months later, Karen Sympathy gets the show out of reruns, by bringing Rocky and Bullwinkle into the real world and stopping RBTV (Really Bad Television) in New York. RBTV later becomes Rocky and Bullwinkle Television and Karen and Ole sees the Rocky & Bullwinkle movie when the Narrator, Rocky and Bullwinkle returns home in the new movie.
 The Drawn Together Movie: The Movie! faces the cancellation before the gang plots to bring their own show back.
 In the Batman: The Brave and the Bold series finale episode Mitefall, Bat-Mite has grown weary of Batman: The Brave and the Bold, deeming its formula to be tired and repetitive, so he concocts a scheme to make it so bad that the network will have to cancel the show to make way for a darker one.
 In the Teen Titans Go! episodes 43 and 44 from Season 4 The Self-Indulgent 200th Episode Spectacular, Part 1 and The Self-Indulgent 200th Episode Spectacular, Part 2 the Teen Titans deal with being cancelled.
 The original final episode to The Angry Beavers entitled Bye Bye Beavers had the characters freaking out about being cancelled.
 In the film Toy Story 2, Woody wanted to see the final episode of Woody’s Roundup'', but Stinky Pete told him that the show was cancelled due to the popularity of Sci-fi.

See also
 List of television series canceled before airing an episode
 List of television series canceled after one episode

References

External links
 Brilliant but Cancelled: Website dedicated to cancelled television programs

Television programming